Cause for Alarm! is a 1951 melodrama suspense film directed by Tay Garnett, written by Mel Dinelli and Tom Lewis, based on a story by Larry Marcus. Ellen (Loretta Young) narrates the tale of "the most terrifying day of my life", how she was taking care of her bedridden husband George Z. Jones (Barry Sullivan) when he suddenly dropped dead.  The film is in the public domain.

Plot
A flashback shows how Ellen (Loretta Young) met George (Barry Sullivan) in a naval hospital during World War II  while she was dating his friend, Lieutenant Ranney Grahame (Bruce Cowling), a young military doctor whose busy schedule left little time for her. George was a pilot, and Ellen swiftly fell in love with him, although the flashback strongly hints he had some capacity for arrogance and selfishness. Nevertheless, they soon married and, after the war, wound up in a leafy suburban Los Angeles neighborhood.

Unhappily, George is now confined to his bed with heart problems. There is a heat wave, and Ellen is spending most of her time caring for him. George's doctor is their old friend Ranney, with whom George thinks his wife is having an affair. In response, Ranney suggests George may need psychological help. After Ellen tells her bedridden husband she dreams of having children, he becomes angry. Meanwhile, George has written a letter to the district attorney in which he claims his wife and best friend are killing him with overdoses of medicine for his heart.

A little neighbor boy dressed as the movie and TV cowboy, Hopalong Cassidy, and wearing cap pistols (Bradley Mora) befriends the childless Ellen, who gives him cookies. He hands her a toy (fake) television set and asks Ellen to give it to George, which she does whilst serving her husband lunch in bed. He tells her an unsettling story about how, as a child, he had beaten a neighbor boy with a rake until he drew blood. Thinking the thick letter has something to do with insurance, Ellen gives it to the postman (Irving Bacon), who sees George in the upstairs bedroom window. When Ellen rushes up to find out why he has gotten out of bed, George lets her know what the letter says and who it is addressed to. George pulls a gun and is about to kill her when he drops dead on the bed. In her narration she describes George's death as "one of those awful dreams."

Ellen panics over the letter and, as noted by a reviewer over 50 years later, throughout the film's second half seems "much more concerned with absolving herself from the blame of his death than missing her spouse." (However, this could be attributed to his generally abusive behaviour, his specific, unfounded accusations of adultery and attempted murder, and his own attempt to kill her and frame both her and the doctor for attempted murder.) Running from the house and shown the way by two teenagers (in the film's brief nod to Los Angeles' mid-twentieth-century jalopy culture), she chases down the overly talkative postman to whom she gave the letter; but he won't give it back to her without talking to George first, since he wrote it. The postman says she can ask the supervisor at the downtown post office, who has more authority. Ellen is frantic when she gets back to the house, only to find George's aunt Clara (Margalo Gillmore) climbing the stairs to see him and stops her barely in time. After the two talk for a while, Clara again heads up the stairs; but Ellen stops her once more, saying (truthfully) that George told her earlier that he did not want to see his aunt. Clara leaves in a huff, telling her George was "rude, mean and selfish since he's been six... he's worse if anything."

Ellen goes back up to the bedroom to change her clothes in an attempt to behave normally before she goes to see the post office supervisor, and sees the gun still in George's hand, narrating, "Somehow I knew I shouldn't leave it there." As she wrenches the pistol from his hand, it fires. Readying herself to leave the house, a polite but somewhat aggressive notary (Don Haggerty) rings the doorbell, telling her he has an appointment with George to go over some legal documents. She steadfastly says George is too sick to see anyone. Ellen desperately drives downtown to the post office to see the supervisor, who gives her a form for George to sign but then, nettled by Ellen's unhinged and uncooperative behavior, tells her he is going to allow the letter to be delivered. Defeated, she returns to the house and, as she gets to the front door, a kindly neighbor woman (Georgia Backus) offers to help Ellen, since she has seemed so upset all day.

When Ranney shows up to check on George, Ellen is hysterical. Ranney tells her to be calm and goes up to the bedroom. Showing no apparent emotion for his dead best friend, he sees the bullet hole in the floor, finds the gun in a dresser drawer, methodically repositions George's body in the bed, and draws down the window shade. Back downstairs with Ellen, Ranney listens as she tells him what happened, saying "I did everything wrong, just like he said I would." The doorbell rings. She thinks the police have come to arrest her, but Ranney urges Ellen to open the door. When she does, it is the postman, returning the thick letter for insufficient postage. Ranney gives a sigh of relief; Ellen takes back the envelope and is overcome after closing the door. Ranney wordlessly rips the letter into narrow strips and burns these shreds in an ashtray along with a matchbook bearing the embossed names George and Ellen.

Cast

 Loretta Young as Ellen Jones
 Barry Sullivan as George Z. Jones
 Bruce Cowling as Dr. Ranney Grahame
 Margalo Gillmore as aunt Clara Edwards
 Bradley Mora as Hoppy (Billy)
 Irving Bacon as Joe Carston, the postman
 Georgia Backus as Mrs. Warren, the neighbor
 Don Haggerty as Mr. Russell, the notary
 Art Baker as the post office superintendent
 Richard Anderson as the wounded sailor at a naval hospital

Production
Director Tay Garnett thoroughly prepared both cast and crew and the film was shot in 14 days, a rather tight schedule for the era (Young reportedly used the same pre-production technique for her TV series a few years later).  André Previn wrote the score.

Cause for Alarm! is among a few 1950s era MGM films which apparently lapsed into the public domain after their copyrights were not renewed in the 1970s. As with all PD MGM feature-length films produced by the studio itself (and possibly a few they merely distributed), the original film elements are now owned by Turner Entertainment, with distribution rights handled by Warner Bros. (who spoofed the title in one of their 1954 short subject cartoons, Claws for Alarm).

Casting notes
The film's producer Tom Lewis considered Judy Garland for the lead role before giving it to his wife Loretta Young. Irving Bacon (a character actor who appeared in over 400 films during his career) was already widely known as the weary postman in the popular Blondie series of 28 films a decade earlier when he was cast as the postman chased by Ellen. Bradley Mora was a noted child actor on Broadway and had appeared in the 1950 filmed version of Annie Get Your Gun. Margalo Gillmore's successful acting career on Broadway stretched back to the late teens and Georgia Backus (the kindly neighbor gardening next door) had a small role in Orson Welles' Citizen Kane ten years before. Richard Anderson went on to a long and successful career as a supporting actor on US television.

Former child star Carl "Alfalfa" Switzer (of Hal Roach's Our Gang comedy shorts) has a cameo appearance as a man repairing a hot rod car.

Filming locations
Some of the production involved location shooting on residential side streets near Melrose Avenue in Hollywood, California. As seen in the film, the actual address of the main filming location was 116 North Oakhurst Dr., one block south of Beverly Drive, until the house was demolished in the mid-1950s and has since been replaced. Neighboring houses also seen in the film which surrounded the location on Oakhurst Drive and Plymouth Avenue are still standing.

Reception
According to MGM records the film earned $518,000 in the US and Canada and $250,000 elsewhere resulting in a loss of $174,000.

Critical response

When the film was released in 1951, The New York Times film critic, Bosley Crowther, wrote, "Here a simple situation is turned into a thoroughly chilling business by highlighting the most humdrum staples of the everyday American scene ... Cause for Alarm! proves more than anything else that superior writing, directing and acting - and some imagination - can make a little go a long way ... The suspense, under Director Tay Garnett, mounts steadily, almost unbearably, until a final plot twist so original that it's almost a swindle."

Although Crowther criticized the casting of "newcomer" Bruce Cowling as Ranney, calling his performance "wooden", he had only praise for Young, writing "she does splendidly as the desperate housewife, avoiding all the pitfalls, even in her hysterical breakdown at the end."

Time magazine characterized the film "as the year's first thriller with an honest quota of thrills. It pulls off the old Hitchcock trick of giving commonplace people, events and settings a sinister meaning, and it develops its simple, one-track idea with frightening logic." Time's review also noted the strong supporting performances of Margalo Gillmore and Irving Bacon along with the film's "quiet, sunny atmosphere of a pleasant residential street" in Los Angeles.

However, in later decades the film was widely ignored (falling into the public domain) and the few retrospective reviews were less flattering. François Truffaut's short overview of Cause for Alarm! was kinder than many when he wrote, "But all those effects hit home, perfectly timed, and isn't that what counts?" 21st century reviews have tended towards Truffaut's take along with citing the film's suburban noir setting.

Critic Craig Butler also cites the performances of Gillmore and Bacon, along with describing the cinematography by Joseph Ruttenberg and score by André Previn as "huge pluses." Sean Axmaker calls Cause for Alarm! "An unusual entry into the film noir school of paranoia" which "trades the dark alleys and long shadows of urban menace for the sunny, tree-lined streets of middle-class domesticity" whilst noting, "Young's deadened narration adds an eerie mood of doom to the suburban setting."

See also
 List of films in the public domain in the United States

References

External links

 
 
 
 
 
 Cause for Alarm! film trailer at Turner Classic Movies Media Room

1951 films
1950s thriller drama films
American black-and-white films
American thriller drama films
1950s English-language films
Film noir
Films about death
Films directed by Tay Garnett
Films scored by André Previn
Films set in Los Angeles
Metro-Goldwyn-Mayer films
1951 drama films
Melodrama films
1950s American films